Königsee is a town and a municipality in the district of Saalfeld-Rudolstadt, in Thuringia, Germany. The present municipality was formed on 31 December 2012 by the merger of the former municipalities Königsee and Rottenbach, under the name Königsee-Rottenbach. On 1 January 2019 the former municipalities Dröbischau and Oberhain were absorbed, and the name was changed to Königsee.

References

Schwarzburg-Rudolstadt